Dana Erika Eskelson is an American television, film, and theatre actress.

Filmography
Past Midnight (1991)
Singles (1992)
To Sir, with Love II (1996)
Exiled: A Law & Order Movie (TV, 1998)
Cold Creek Manor  (2003)
Griffin & Phoenix (2006) as Mother with Stroller
The Brave One (2007)
Peter and Vandy (2009)
The Company Men (2010)
Deep Powder (2013) as Michelle
See You Next Tuesday (2013) as May
True Story (2015) as Mrs. Longo
Please Be Normal (2015) as Amy
Emily & Tim (2015)

TV series
New York Undercover (1997–98) (3 episodes as Nadine Jordan)
Prince Street (1997) as Det. Diane Hoffman, Lead
Whoopi (2003)
Law & Order: Criminal Intent episode "Ill-Bred" as Paige Mullen (2004)
Law & Order (2005), guest star
Brotherhood (2006) (2 episodes as Dina Finnerty)
Law & Order: Special Victims Unit episode "Futility" as Karen Leighton (2003) and "Web" as Ms. Winnock (2006)
The Americans (Season 2, Episode 1 as Bernadette) (2013)
The Good Wife episode "Invitation to an Inquest" (2013) as Bethany Bigelow
Bull episode "Parental Guidance" (2019) as Brenda

Theater 

 A Perfect Couple (2008)
 Massacre (Sing to Your Children) (2012)

References

External links

American stage actresses
American film actresses
American television actresses
Actresses from New Jersey
20th-century American actresses
21st-century American actresses
Living people
Year of birth missing (living people)